The Battle of Koljonvirta i.e. the Battle of the Virta Bridge was fought between Swedish and Russian troops on October 27, 1808. The Swedish force consisted of troops from Savolax and Östergötland. After the main Swedish army had been defeated at the Battle of Oravais the army under Johan August Sandels in Savonia had to retreat in order not to be outflanked by the Russians. Sandels found a good defensive position north of Iisalmi and decided to resist the Russian advance there.

Between September 29 and October 27 a cease-fire was in effect. Sandels was heavily outnumbered but had a good defensive position between two lakes connected by the Koljonvirta river and he had prepared his position well during the cease-fire. On October 27 the cease-fire was to end at 1 PM, but Russians started their attack a little earlier, perhaps because of the time difference between Sweden and Russia. Sandels pulled back the forces on the south side of the river and the Russians attacked over the partially demolished bridge. The Swedes counter-attacked and literally pushed the Russian troops into the river. The Russians pulled up fresh troops on the south side of the river, but they didn't try to attack again. The battle was the last Swedish victory on Finnish soil.

See also
 Sven Dufva

Citations and sources

Citations

Sources

Koljonvirta
Koljonvirta 1808
Iisalmi
1808 in Finland
Koljonvirta
Koljonvirta
History of North Savo
October 1808 events